National Highway 647, commonly referred to as NH 647 is a national highway in India. It is a secondary route of primary National Highway 47.  NH-647 runs in the state of Maharashtra in India.

Route 
NH647 connects Arvi, Pimpalkuta, Kanrangna, Anji, Pavnar and Wardha in the state of Maharashtra.

Junctions  
 
  Terminal near Arvi.
  near Lonikand

See also 
 List of National Highways in India
 List of National Highways in India by state

References

External links 

 NH 647 on OpenStreetMap

National highways in India
National Highways in Maharashtra